In molecular biology, the protein domain Saccharopine dehydrogenase (SDH), also named Saccharopine reductase, is an enzyme involved in the metabolism of the amino acid lysine, via an intermediate substance called saccharopine. It has an important function in lysine metabolism and catalyses a reaction in the alpha-Aminoadipic acid pathway. This pathway is unique to fungal organisms therefore, this molecule could be useful in the search for new antibiotics. This protein family also includes saccharopine dehydrogenase and homospermidine synthase. It is found in prokaryotes, eukaryotes and archaea.

Function 
Simplistically, SDH uses NAD+ as an oxidant to catalyse the reversible pyridine nucleotide dependent oxidative deamination of the substrate, Saccharopine, in order to form the products, lysine and alpha-ketoglutarate.
This can be described by the following equation:

SDH
Saccharopine    ⇌   lysine + alpha-ketoglutarate

Saccharopine dehydrogenase EC catalyses the condensation to of l-alpha-aminoadipate-delta-semialdehyde (AASA) with l-glutamate to give an imine, which is reduced by NADPH to give saccharopine. In some organisms this enzyme is found as a bifunctional polypeptide with lysine ketoglutarate reductase (PF).

Homospermidine synthase proteins (EC). Homospermidine synthase (HSS) catalyses the synthesis of the polyamine homospermidine from 2 mol putrescine in an NAD+-dependent reaction.

Structure 
There appears to be two  protein domains of similar size. One domain is a Rossmann fold that binds NAD+/NADH, and the other is relatively similar. Both domains contain a six-stranded parallel beta-sheet surrounded by alpha-helices and loops (alpha/beta fold).

Clinical significance
Deficiencies are associated with hyperlysinemia.

References 

 

Protein domains
Protein families